PEHO syndrome (progressive encephalopathy with edema, hypsarrhythmia and optic atrophy) is an autosomal recessive and dominant, progressive neurodegenerative disorder that starts in the first few weeks or months of life. Early symptoms include infantile spasms, hyparrhythmia, and seizures, and optic atrophy. Other features include arrest of global developmental delay, severe intellectual deficit, encephalopathy, tapered fingers, and facial dysmorphism.

There is no specific treatment for PEHO syndrome; only the symptoms associated with the syndrome can be managed. PEHO syndrome affects the Finnish population with an estimate of 1 in 78,000; cases have been described in non-Finnish persons and from other countries.

Cause 
The cause of the Finnish-type PEHO syndrome is homozygous pathogenic variants in the ZNHIT3 gene. Variants affecting the motor domain of KIF1A has also been suggested to cause full or partial phenotype of PEHO in others. There has been other pathogenic variants in other genes known to be associated with the syndrome.

Diagnosis

Treatment
There is no cure for PEHO syndrome. Some symptoms can be managed, but otherwise treatment is supportive care.

References

External links 

Rare syndromes